Trones is one of 54 parish councils in Cangas del Narcea, a municipality within the province and autonomous community of Asturias, in northern Spain. 

Its villages include:  Araniegu, Faéu, Ḷḷourante, Olgu, Paraxas, Rozas and Trones.

Parishes in Cangas del Narcea